Fionn O'Shea (born 2 January 1997) is an Irish actor. He starred in the films Handsome Devil (2016) and Dating Amber (2020). On television, he is known for his roles in the Channel 4 sitcom Hang Ups (2018) and the BBC Three and Hulu miniseries Normal People (2020).

Early life and education
O'Shea attended Gonzaga College in Ranelagh, Dublin. He went on to train at Visions Drama School.

Career
In 2007, O'Shea made his film debut in the Irish short film New Boy; it received an Academy Award nomination for Best Live Action Short Film. In 2009, he made his feature film debut, playing an orphan boy in A Shine of Rainbows. Between 2009 and 2012 he appeared on Roy, an Irish-British animated children's television series. In 2016, he portrayed Ned Roche in the Irish comedy-drama film Handsome Devil. At the 15th Irish Film & Television Awards in 2018 he was nominated for Actor in a leading role and Rising Star Award. In 2018 he featured on Hang Ups, a British television sitcom. Also in 2018 he appeared in Innocent, a British television miniseries. In 2019, he played a supporting role in the drama film The Aftermath. In 2020, he played Eddie in Dating Amber, and Jamie in Normal People.

Filmography

Film

Television

Awards and nominations

Notes

References

External links
 

Living people
1997 births
21st-century Irish male actors
Irish male film actors
Irish male television actors
Male actors from Dublin (city)
People educated at Gonzaga College